Öre is the centesimal subdivision of the Swedish krona. In the Swedish language, the plural of öre is either öre or ören.

The name öre derives from the Latin word aereus/aurum, meaning gold. The corresponding subdivisions of the Norwegian and Danish krones are called øre.

History 
During the Middle Ages, the öre was a unit of Swedish currency equal to 1/8 of a mark, 3 örtugar or either 24, 36 or 48 penningar (depending on the geographical area in which it was used). It was already a unit of account in the 11th century, but was not minted as a coin until 1522. This öre was withdrawn in 1776, but returned in 1855 as 1/100 of the riksdaler. The riksdaler was replaced by the krona in 1873 (one riksdaler equalling one krona), but öre remained the name of the minor unit. 

The last öre coin was withdrawn in 2010, but the centesimal subdivision is still used in non-cash contexts such as bank balances and cashless transactions, while bills to be paid in cash are rounded to the nearest krona.

Coins

1 öre 
1 öre coins, by king 1844–1973

2 öre

5 öre

10 öre

25 öre

50 öre 

From October 1992, the only coin in use in Sweden with a value below 1 kronor was the 50 öre coin. On 18 December 2008, the Swedish Riksbank announced a recommendation to the Swedish government to phase out the final öre coin by 2010. The coin ceased to be minted on 25 March 2009 and ceased to be legal tender after 30 September 2010.

See also

Other coin with names deriving from the gold of which they were once made:
 Øre
 Guilder
 Polish złoty#First złoty

References

Currencies of Sweden
Numismatics